Sleepless Night may refer to:

Film
 Sleepless Night (1960 film), a Soviet drama film
 Sleepless Night (2010 film), a Belgian short film
 Sleepless Night (2011 film), a thriller film by Frédéric Jardin
 Sleepless (2017 film) (working title Sleepless Night), an American remake of the 2011 film

Music
 Sleepless Night, a 1992 album by Frankie Paul
 Sleepless Night, a composition by George Gershwin
 "Sleepless Night...", a song by CNBLUE from Can't Stop, 2014
 "Sleepless Night", a song by John Lennon and Yoko Ono from Milk and Honey, 1984
 "Sleepless Night", a song by Shinee from The Misconceptions of Us, 2013

See also
 Insomnia
 Sleepless Nights (disambiguation)